Houstonia teretifolia is a plant species in the family Rubiaceae, endemic to the Mexican state of Coahuila.

Houstonia teretifolia is distinguished by other species in the genus by having leaves that are terete, i.e., long and narrow, round in cross-section.

References

teretifolia
Endemic flora of Mexico
Flora of Coahuila
Plants described in 1979